The men's team pursuit race of the 2011 World Single Distance Speed Skating Championships was held on 13 March at 16:15 local time.

Results

References

2011 World Single Distance Speed Skating Championships